Welch Island may refer to:

 Welch Island (Antarctica)
 Welch Island (British Columbia) in British Columbia, Canada
 Welch Island (New Hampshire) in New Hampshire, United States
 Welch Island (Nevada) in Nevada, United States
 Welch Island (Oregon) in Oregon, United States